Morchella deliciosa is a species of edible fungus in the family Morchellaceae. It was first described scientifically by Elias Magnus Fries in 1822. It is a European species, although the name has erroneously been applied to morphologically similar North American morels.

References

External links

deliciosa
Edible fungi
Fungi of Europe
Fungi described in 1822
Taxa named by Elias Magnus Fries